Krasny is a rural locality (a khutor) in and the administrative center of Krasnyanskoye Rural Settlement, Uryupinsky District, Volgograd Oblast, Russia. The population was 416 as of 2010. There are 10 streets.

Geography 
Krasny is located in steppe, 22 km east of Uryupinsk (the district's administrative centre) by road. Kukhtinsky is the nearest rural locality.

References 

Rural localities in Uryupinsky District